Chornyi Ostriv (alternatively: Chornyy Ostriv; "Black Island") can mean:

 Chornyi Ostriv, Khmelnytskyi Oblast, an urban-type settlement in Khmelnytskyi Raion, Khmelnytskyi Oblast, Ukraine
 Chornyi Ostriv, Lviv Oblast, a village in Zhydachiv Raion, Lviv Oblast, Ukraine
 Chornyi Ostriv (railway stop), located near Chornyi Ostriv in Lviv Oblast, on the Lviv-Chernivtsi line

See also 
 Ostriv (disambiguation)